Anthony Ireland may refer to:

 Anthony Ireland (actor) (1902–1957), British actor
 Anthony Ireland (basketball) (born 1989), American basketball player
 Anthony Ireland (cricketer) (born 1984), cricketer from Zimbabwe